Port Blair is the capital city of the Andaman and Nicobar Islands, a union territory of India in the Bay of Bengal. It is also the local administrative sub-division (tehsil) of the islands, the headquarters for the district of South Andaman and is the territory's only notified town.

Port Blair serves as the entry point for visiting the Andaman and Nicobar Islands. Port Blair is connected with mainland India by both air and sea. It is a two to three-hour flight from mainland India to Port Blair's Veer Savarkar International Airport, and three to four days by sea to reach Kolkata, Chennai, or Visakhapatnam from Haddo Wharf in Port Blair. It is home to several museums and a major naval base INS Jarawa of the Indian Navy, along with sea and air bases of the Indian Coast Guard, Andaman and Nicobar Police, Andaman and Nicobar Command, the first integrated tri-command of the Indian Armed Forces and the Indian Air Force.

Port Blair is also famous for the historic Cellular Jail and other small islands like Corbyn's Cove, Wandoor, Ross Island, Viper Island and so forth, which were once home to British colonists. Port Blair has been selected as one of the cities to be developed as a smart city under the Smart Cities Mission.

History

Pre-history
The indigenous inhabitants are the Andamenese. Radiocarbon dating studies of the kitchen refuse dumps from the mounds excavated by the Anthropological Survey of India at Choladari near Port Blair indicate human occupation for at least 2,000 years, although they are likely to have diverged from the inhabitants of the mainland significantly earlier.

Modern history
In 1789 the Government of Bengal established a penal colony on Chatham Island in the southeast bay of Great Andaman, named Port Blair in the honour of Archibald Blair of the East India Company. After two years, the colony moved to the northeast part of Great Andaman and was named Port Cornwallis after Admiral William Cornwallis. However, there was much disease and death in the penal colony, and the government ceased operating it in May 1796.

In 1824 Port Cornwallis was the rendezvous of the fleet carrying the army to the First Anglo-Burmese War. In the 1830s and 1840s, shipwrecked crews who landed on the Andamans were often attacked and killed by the natives, alarming the British government. In 1855, the government proposed another settlement on the islands, including a convict establishment, but the Indian Rebellion of 1857 forced a delay in its construction.

However, since the rebellion provided the British with a lot of new prisoners, it made the new Andaman settlement and prison an urgent necessity. Construction began in November 1857 at the renovated Port Blair, avoiding the vicinity of a salt swamp which seemed to have been the source of many of the old colony's problems. The penal colony was originally on Viper Island. The convicts, mostly political prisoners, suffered life imprisonment at hard labour under cruel and degrading conditions. Many were hanged, while others died of disease and starvation. Between 1864 and 1867 a penal establishment was also built with convict labour on the northern side of Ross Island. These structures now lie in ruins.

As the Indian independence movement continued to grow in the late 19th century, the enormous Cellular Jail was constructed between 1896 and 1906 to house Indian convicts, mostly political prisoners, in solitary confinement. The Cellular Jail is also known as Kala Pani (translated as "Black Waters"), a name given to it due to the torture and general ill-treatment towards its Indian convicts.

The airport at Port Blair, Andaman and Nicobar's capital, has been named Veer Savarkar International Airport. The commemorative blue plaque on India House fixed by the Historic Building and Monuments Commission for England reads "Vinayak Damodar Savarkar 1883–1966 Indian patriot and philosopher lived here."

In World War II the islands were occupied by the Japanese on 23 March 1942 without opposition from the garrison. From 1943 to 1944, Port Blair served as the headquarters of the Azad Hind government under Subhas Chandra Bose. British forces returned to the islands in October 1945.

Although affected by the 2004 Indian Ocean earthquake and tsunami, Port Blair survived sufficiently to act as a base for relief efforts in the islands.

Climate
Port Blair has a tropical monsoon climate (Köppen climate classification Am), with little variation in average temperature and large amounts of precipitation throughout the year. All months except January, February and March receive substantial rainfall.

Tourism 
Port Blair being the capital city of Andaman and Nicobar Islands is the entry point for all tourism related activities. Tourists first have to arrive to Port Blair before progressing on to any other islands in Andaman. At Port Blair, the major tourist places to visit are the Cellular Jail, Corbyns Cove Beach, North Bay Island, Ross Island renamed to Netaji Subhash Chandra Bose Island, Chidiatapu, Wandoor and other museums that are present within city limits. Entry charges are applicable to some of the tourist places.

Demographics
 India census, Port Blair had a population of 100,608. Males constitute 52.92% (53,247) of the population and females 47.07% (47,361). 9.3% of the population is under the age of 6 years.

Language

Bengali is the most spoken language of the city, followed by Tamil, Hindi and Telugu.

Religion

The most common religion is Hinduism, followed by Christianity and Islam.

Literacy
 
Port Blair has an average literacy rate of 89.76%, higher than the national average that is 74.04%. In Port Blair, male literacy is 92.79%, and female literacy is 86.34%.

Administration
The Port Blair Municipal Council, abbreviated as PBMC is the ruling civic body administering the city of Port Blair, the capital and the largest city in the Indian union territory of Andaman and Nicobar Islands. The council came into existence on 2 October 1957 after the assent by the President of India to the Andaman & Nicobar Islands (Municipal Board’s) Regulation, 1957 Act on 11 March 1957. The council comprises a total of 24 wards after the recent delimitation and the expansion of the city limits with the merger of few other villages to the existing 18 wards previously.

The recent elections for the council were held in 2022. U. Kavitha from ward 24 a member of the Bharatiya Janata Party was elected as the chairperson for the first term which commenced from 16 March 2022. On 14 March 2023, Telugu Desam Party councilor S. Selvi from ward 5 was elected as the chairperson for the second year term of commencing from 16 March 2023 as part of the joint candidature from the BJP-TDP Alliance.

PBMC electoral history

Education

B.Ed
Tagore Government College of Education

Degree
Andaman and Nicobar college
Jawaharlal Nehru Government College

Engineering
Dr. B. R. Ambedkar Institute of Technology

Law
Andaman Law College

Medicine
Andaman and Nicobar Islands Institute of Medical Sciences

Gallery

See also
Cellular Jail
Charles James Lyall
Vinayak Damodar Savarkar
Ross Island
Havelock Island

References

External links

 
Cities and towns in South Andaman district
South Andaman Island
Indian union territory capitals
Ports and harbours of the Andaman and Nicobar Islands
Populated places established in 1789
1789 establishments in India
1789 establishments in British India
Tourist attractions in the Andaman and Nicobar Islands